Derafsh is a  serving in the Northern Fleet of the Islamic Republic of Iran Navy.

Construction and commissioning 
She was launched on 27 November 2008 and commissioned into service in 2009.

Service history 
Derafsh, along with the frigate , left home for a visit to Makhachkala, Russia on in March 2017.

See also

 List of current ships of the Islamic Republic of Iran Navy 
 List of military equipment manufactured in Iran

References 

Missile boats of the Islamic Republic of Iran Navy
Ships built at Shahid Tamjidi shipyard
Ships of the Islamic Republic of Iran Navy
Ships built in Iran
Missile boats of Iran